À toute allure is a 1982 French drama film directed by Robert Kramer. It was entered into the 1982 Cannes Film Festival.

Cast
 Laure Duthilleul - Nelly
 William Cherino - Serge
 Bernard Ballet - Felix 
 Manuelle Lidsky - Manu
 Pierre Hurel - The child
 Natacha Jeanneau - The mother
 André S. Labarthe - Himself, narrator (cold open)
 Robert Kramer - Himself (cold open)

References

External links

1982 films
1982 drama films
1980s French-language films
French drama films
Films directed by Robert Kramer
1980s French films